Kurd Mehmed Pasha or Kurt Mehmet Pasha (Mehmed Pasha the Wolf; died 1605 or 1606) was an Ottoman statesman who served as the Ottoman governor of Egypt from 1594 or 1595 (specifically, 1003 AH) to April 1596, and the Ottoman governor of Aleppo from 1596 or 1597 (specifically, 1005 AH) sporadically until his death.

He graduated from the palace Enderun School in Istanbul and became kapıcıbaşı ("chief gatekeeper," a sort of master of ceremonies) in 1582.

He died in 1605 or 1606 and was buried in the Gazi Atik Ali Pasha Mosque's cemetery in Istanbul.

See also
 List of Ottoman governors of Egypt

References

Pashas
16th-century Ottoman governors of Egypt
17th-century people from the Ottoman Empire
Ottoman governors of Egypt
1600s deaths
Year of birth unknown
Ottoman governors of Aleppo